Govind Park is a multi-use stadium in Ba, Fiji.  It is currently used mostly for football matches and hosts the home matches of Ba F.C. The stadium holds 13,500 people. It is named after one of the former mayors of Ba town, Kishore Govind.

Govind Park has hosted football tournaments such as the Fiji Fact, Battle of the Giants and Inter District Championship. The stadium was officially opened on 17 July 1976 by the ex-president of Fiji Football Association, Manikam V. Pillay. In June 2011 it hosted the 2011 Kshatriya World Cup, in which Nadi Khatri won by beating Men In Black Ba 2-0 in the final.

References

Football venues in Fiji
Sports venues completed in 1976